Choklay Wangchuk is a Bhutanese international footballer. He made his first appearance in their 2019 AFC Asian Cup qualifying match against Bangladesh, being named in the starting lineup and playing the whole game.

Club career

ARA FC
On 1 December 2018, it was announced that Choki Wangchuk would go on to ARA FC, also of the I-League 2nd Division.

References

External links

Bhutanese footballers
Bhutan international footballers
Living people
Association football forwards
1998 births
Expatriate footballers in India
Bhutanese expatriate sportspeople in India